Brebina may refer to the following places in Romania:

 Brebina, a village in the town of Baia de Aramă, Mehedinți County, 
 Brebina, a village in Scrioaștea Commune, Teleorman County, Romania
 Brebina Mare, a tributary of the river Bârsa in Brașov County
 Brebina (Motru), a tributary of the river Motru in Mehedinți County

See also 
 Breb (disambiguation)
 Brebu (disambiguation)